Peel Park is an area of East Kilbride in South Lanarkshire, Scotland.  It is a business park, and home to the following companies:

Resident companies
 British Energy
 LBJ
 Memex Technology Limited
 Micron Technology
 Intoto Group (formerly Mowlem Energy Services)
 Wipro
 IBM
 SEPA
 Sulzer
 Travis Perkins
 John Macdonald Group
 Alex McDougall (Mowers) Ltd.
 Soben Contract & Commercial Ltd

Road links
Peel Park is the location where the Glasgow Southern Orbital (GSO) dual-carriageway which connects East Kilbride to the M77 motorway enters the town. Access from East Kilbride comes from the Queensway (A726) or from Eaglehsam Road (B764).

Redwood Avenue, Drive, Crescent and Place are named after the Giant Redwood (Sequoia) trees in the area.

See also
List of places in South Lanarkshire
List of places in Scotland

External links
 M77 GSO Project website
 Redwood World (Redwoods in the British Isles) website
 

Science parks in the United Kingdom
Science and technology in Scotland
Business parks of Scotland
Economy of South Lanarkshire
Areas of East Kilbride